Eric Clemons is an American sportscaster currently with ESPN. In the past he has worked for Fox Sports, BET and served as a sports reporter and anchor for a number of local television stations.

Early life
Eric Clemons was born in early November 1959 on the South Side of Chicago, Illinois to a low income family. After attending Chicago Vocational High School, Clemons was accepted at Columbia College to study Broadcast Communications. Upon graduating in 1981, Eric eventually was offered his first commercial television job as a sports anchor/reporter for WALA-TV in Mobile, Alabama.

Career timeline

Personal life
Eric Clemons is a father of two and has been married for over 30 years. His wife, Renita McKay Clemons, also grew up on the south side of Chicago. She is a writer pursuing her master's degree in English Literature. Eric has 2 older siblings and a large extended family. His daughter, 28, is a grad student in the San Francisco, CA area and his son, 24, is a member of the United States Air Force.

Clemons recently returned to school and completed his master's degree in Interactive Communications Media from Quinnipiac University. He has engaged in public speaking events for local schools, churches, and community colleges, and dabbled in the performing arts. Clemons was the lead in the Repertory Theater of New Brittan's production of Blues in the Night, conceived and directed by Sheldon Epps in 2009. He is also one of the front-line members of the popular Motown cover band 'Soul Sound Revue'.

References

Georgia Tech Yellow Jackets football announcers
National Football League announcers
Living people
American sports announcers
Year of birth missing (living people)